Katynkol is a salt lake in Karkaraly District, Karaganda Region, Kazakhstan.

Katynkol usually freezes in November and thaws in April.

Geography
Katynkol is an endorheic lake part of the wide Karasor basin. Its water is salty, containing sodium and magnesium chlorides. There is a headland in the northeastern lakeshore forming a wide bay in the northern sector of the lake. Part of the shore is steep, bound by grey sandstone cliffs of moderate height.

It is fed mainly by melted snow and groundwater, as well as some precipitation and rarely dries in the summer. River Zharym, having its sources in the northern slopes of the Karkaraly Range, flows from the south into the southern end of the lake.

Flora
The land around Katynkol consists largely of plowed agricultural fields. The vegetation of the flat terraced areas by the lakeshore includes fescue, wormwood, licorice and needlegrass.

See also 
List of lakes of Kazakhstan

References

External links

Озера и реки Казахстана (in Russian)

Lakes of Kazakhstan
Endorheic lakes of Asia
Karaganda Region
Kazakh Uplands